The bisexual flag is a pride flag representing bisexuality, bisexual individuals and the bisexual community. The magenta stripe represents attraction to the same sex, while the blue stripe represents attraction to the opposite sex. The purple stripe, the resulting "overlap" of the blue and magenta stripes, represents attraction regardless of sex or gender.

The flag was designed by Michael Page in 1998 to increase the visibility of bisexuals among society as a whole and within the LGBT community. He aimed to give the bisexual community a symbol that is comparable to the rainbow flag for the greater LGBT community. The first bisexual pride flag was unveiled at the BiCafe's first anniversary party on December 5, 1998.

Design and colors

Page stated that he took the colors and overlap from the biangles, also known as the bisexuality triangles. The biangles were designed by artist Liz Nania as she co-organized a bisexual contingent for the Second National March on Washington for Lesbian and Gay Rights in 1987. The design of the biangles began with the pink triangle, a Nazi concentration camp badge that later became a symbol of gay liberation representing homosexuality. The addition of a blue triangle contrasts the pink and represents heterosexuality. The two triangles overlap and form lavender, which represents, in Nania's words, "the queerness of bisexuality and it's disruption of the traditional gender binary", referencing the Lavender Menace and similar organizations associated with the color.

Page described the meaning of the pink, purple, and blue colors:

 

The flag is used in different aspect ratios; 2:3 and 3:5 are often used, in common with many other flags. 

The exact colors given by Page are PMS 226 for the pink, 258 for the purple, and 286 for the blue. The pink stripe takes up two fifths of the flag, the purple stripe takes up the middle fifth, and the blue stripe takes up the other two fifths. The flag has been most commonly oriented with the pink stripe at the top, but both orientations are acceptable. The flag is not patented, trademarked, or service marked.

Licensing controversy

In 1998, Page stated that the bisexual pride flag was "for free public and commercial use" and that it was "not patented, trademarked or service marked." In April 2020, BiNet USA falsely claimed that it was the sole copyright owner of the flag and flag colors, and said organizations and individuals who wished to use the flag for commercial purposes would be required to obtain a license from the organization, despite having nothing to do with the flag's design or creation. BiNet's claim and the resulting controversy were covered by Out and LGBTQ Nation, which cast doubt on BiNet's claim and noted that the flag is not eligible for copyright.

BiNet USA ultimately ceased to use the flag on May 8, opting instead to use a different design.

See also

 Bisexual American history
 Bisexual community
 Bisexual lighting
 Celebrate Bisexuality Day
 LGBT symbols

References

External links
 

Pride flag
LGBT flags
Flags introduced in 1998
Sexuality flags